The  2012–13 season was the 87th season of competitive football by Universitatea Cluj.

Players

Squad information 

|-
|colspan="12"|Players sold or loaned out during the season
|-

Transfers

In

Out

Competitions

Overall

Liga I

League table

Results summary

Results by round

Points by opponent

Results

Cupa României

Results

Notes and references 

2012-13
Romanian football clubs 2012–13 season